is a senior high school in Hamamatsu, Japan, operated by the city government.

Because the city of Hamamatsu has one of the largest non-Japanese populations in the country, 60% of which is composed of expatriates of Brazilian descent.  there is a significant enrollment of students who do not speak Japanese as a primary language.  Non-Japanese students are placed in special classes.

See also
 Brazilians in Japan
 Language minority students in Japanese classrooms
 Mundo de Alegría - Brazilian and Peruvian international school in Hamamatsu

References

External links
  Hamamatsu Municipal Senior High School
  Hamamatsu Municipal Senior High School
  Articles about the school  at the Chunichi Shimbun

High schools in Shizuoka Prefecture
Schools in Hamamatsu